The 2019 Dubai Women's Sevens will be an tournament held at The Sevens Stadium in Dubai, United Arab Emirates from 5–7 December 2019. It will be the ninth edition of the Dubai Women's Sevens and will also be the second tournament of the 2019–20 World Rugby Women's Sevens Series.

Format
The teams are drawn into three pools of four teams each. Each team plays every other team in their pool once. The top two teams from each pool advance to the Cup/Plate brackets while the top 2 third place teams also compete in the Cup/Plate. The other teams from each group play-off for the Challenge Trophy.

Teams
Twelve teams will compete in the tournament with eleven being the core teams that compete throughout the entire season. The invited team for this tournament is Japan who was invited after last competing in the previous round.

Pool stage

Pool A

Pool B

Pool C

Placement matches

Eleventh place

Ninth place

Knockout stage

Cup

Tournament placings

Source: World Rugby

See also
 World Rugby Women's Sevens Series
 2019–20 World Rugby Women's Sevens Series
 2019 South Africa Sevens

See also
 World Rugby Women's Sevens Series
 2019–20 World Rugby Women's Sevens Series
 2019 Dubai Sevens

References

External links 
 Tournament site
 World Rugby info

2019
2019–20 World Rugby Women's Sevens Series
2019 in women's rugby union
2019 in Emirati sport
2019 in Asian rugby union
Dubai Sevens